Dan Lorge is an American voice actor. He currently teaches acting at Take 2 Performers Studio in Reno, Nevada.

Selected filmography

Anime 

 Lupin the 3rd Part II (1977–1980) – Inspector Koichi Zenigata
 Fist of the North Star (1984–1987) – Additional Voices
 Rurouni Kenshin (1996–1998) – Henya Kariwa, Additional Voices (Media Blasters Dub)
 Trigun (1998) – Barfly 3 (ep. 1), Descartes Lackey 3 (ep. 1), Townsman (ep. 3), Bus Driver (ep. 9), Additional Voices
Digimon Adventure (1999) – Shellmon, Monzaemon, Warumonzaemon, Additional Voices
 The Big O (1999–2003) – MP Boat Patrol (ep. 5)
Digimon Adventure 02 (2000) – Chikara Hida, Seadramon, Deputymon, Additional Voices
 Shinzo (2000) – Hyper Mushra, Katai
 Cyborg 009 (2001–2002) – Zanbarusu (ep. 9), Additional Voices

OVAs and Specials 

The Guyver: Bio-Booster Armor (1989–1992) – Derzerb, Yōhei Onuma, Zerbebuth (ep. 3), Takasato (ep. 4)
Giant Robo: The Animation (1992–1998) – Professor Shizuma (Animaze Dub)

Anime films 

Lupin the 3rd: The Mystery of Mamo (1978) – Inspector Koichi Zenigata (Geneon Dub)
Akira (1988) – Councilman 1 (Animaze Dub)

Video games 
 Digimon World Data Squad - Gaomon, MachGaogamon, MirageGaogamon

References 

  Content in this article was copied from Dan Lorge at Dubbing Wikia, which is licensed under the Creative Commons Attribution-Share Alike 3.0 (Unported) (CC-BY-SA 3.0) license.

External links 

Living people
American male voice actors
American directors
American producers
American writers
Year of birth missing (living people)